The following is a list of countries by maize exports. Data is for 2023, in millions of United States dollars, as reported by The Observatory of Economic Complexity. Currently the top twenty countries are listed.

 United States: US$19.1 billion (37.2% of total corn exports)
 Argentina: $9.1 billion (17.6%)
 Ukraine: $5.9 billion (11.4%)
 Brazil: $4.2 billion (8.1%)
 Romania: $1.9 billion (3.8%)
 France: $1.9 billion (3.8%)
 Hungary: $1 billion (2%)
 India: $935.6 million (1.8%)
 South Africa: $809.3 million (1.6%)
 Russia: $694.2 million (1.4%)
 Poland: $633.8 million (1.2%)
 Serbia: $605.1 million (1.2%)
 Canada: $491.8 million (1%)
 Bulgaria: $486.4 million (0.9%)
 Myanmar: $483.6 million (0.9%)

References
- Observatory of Economic complexity - Countries that export Corn (2016)

Maize
Maize